Phil Leeds (April 6, 1916 – August 16, 1998) was an American character actor. He is best known for appearing in many movies and television series, including guest appearances in The Dick Van Dyke Show, Maude,  Friends, Barney Miller, The Golden Girls, Everybody Loves Raymond, Boy Meets World and more.

Early life
Leeds was born on April 6, 1916, in New York City, the son of a post office clerk. Raised in the Bronx, he was a peanut vendor for some time near Yankee Stadium and Manhattan's Polo Grounds. After serving in the US Army in World War II, he started his entertainment career.

Career 
He began his career as a standup comedian and then went on to appear in several films and sitcoms, including Rosemary's Baby, Beaches, All in the Family, Three's Company, Night Court, Wings, Ally McBeal, Everybody Loves Raymond, The Larry Sanders Show in three episodes as Hank Kingsley's agent, Barney Miller in seven episodes including in one as a man who propositions Detective Fish, Car 54, Where Are You?, The Patty Duke Show, The Monkees, The Odd Couple, Happy Days, Friends, Roseanne as Leon's co-worker and lover, Mad About You, The Dick Van Dyke Show, as Buddy Sorrell's pool shark brother, The Golden Girls, and Double Rush. Other roles include appearing as a friendly spirit in the 1990 film Ghost, the episode "When I'm 64" of the TV series ALF as Jack, one of the residents of a retirement home.

At age 80, he appeared on the 1996 Halloween episode of Roseanne, "Satan, Darling", in which Roseanne finds herself drawn into a parody version of Rosemary's Baby (Leeds had played Dr. Shand in the original 1968 film). His final role was a brief scene in Lost & Found (1999).

Blacklist
Leeds was blacklisted during the McCarthy era after pleading the fifth when examined by the House Un-American Activities Committee.

Personal life
Leeds was married to fellow character actress Toby Brandt for 53 years (1934–1987) until her death. Leeds was Jewish.

Death
Leeds died of pneumonia on August 16, 1998, at Cedars-Sinai Medical Center in Los Angeles at age 82. "Happy Trails," an episode of Ally McBeal, featured footage of his prior appearances on the show, eulogizing his character.

Filmography

The Dick Van Dyke Show (1962, TV Series) as Blackie Sorrell
The Monkees (1966, TV Series) as Bernie
Rosemary's Baby (1968) as Dr. Shand
Don't Drink the Water (1969) as Sam Blackwell
The Odd Couple (1972) as Salty Pepper
Maude (1973, TV Series) as Principal Fishman 
Mastermind (1976) as Israeli Agent #2
Won Ton Ton, the Dog Who Saved Hollywood (1976) as Dog Catcher
Silent Movie (1976) as Waiter (uncredited)
Three's Company (1979) as Lyle Wormwold
History of the World, Part I (1981) as Chief Monk for the Spanish Inquisition
Frankenstein's Great Aunt Tillie (1984) as Banker Schlockmocker
Night Court (1984, TV Series) as Norm, God 2 and Arnold Koppelson
Saturday the 14th Strikes Back (1988) as Leonard
Beaches (1988) as Sammy Pinkers
Cat Chaser (1989) as Jerry Shea
Enemies, A Love Story (1989) as Pesheles
Ghost (1990) as Ghost in the Emergency Room
Coach (1990, TV Series) as Man
He Said, She Said (1991) as Mr. Spepk
Soapdish (1991) as Old Man
Frankie and Johnny (1991) as Mr. DeLeon
All I Want for Christmas (1991) as Mr. Feld
Matlock (1993, TV Series) as Marty Willis
Clean Slate (1994) as Landlord
The Larry Sanders Show (1994) as Sid Bessel, Hank's agent
Double Rush (1995, TV series) as "The Kid"
Two Much (1996) as The Lincoln Brigade
Friends (1996) as Mr. Adelman
Everybody Loves Raymond (1996-1998) as Uncle Mel
Wings (1996, TV Series) as Lou
Murphy Brown (1997, TV Series) as Old Man
Krippendorf's Tribe (1998) as Dr. Harvey
Lost & Found (1999) as Mr. Elderly Couple (final film role)
Boy Meets World as Phil/Milton
Barney Miller as Arthur Bloom

References

External links
 

1916 births
1998 deaths
20th-century American male actors
American male film actors
American male television actors
American people of Jewish descent
Deaths from pneumonia in California
Male actors from New York City